H09 is a national road (H-Highway) in Lviv Oblast, Ivano-Frankivsk Oblast and Zakarpattia Oblast, Ukraine. It runs north-south and connects Mukachevo with Lviv.

Main route

Main route and connections to/intersections with other highways in Ukraine.

See also

 Roads in Ukraine

References

External links
Regional Roads in Ukraine in Russian

Roads in Zakarpattia Oblast
Roads in Lviv Oblast
Roads in Ivano-Frankivsk Oblast